Communes ( or ), officially known as administrative units or units of local administration, government, or governance since 2015, are the 373 third-level administrative divisions of Albania which serve as its local government. There are 12 counties and 61 municipalities above the communes and 2,972 villages below them.

History
The current division of Albania in 373 administrative units was enacted in 2014 and carried out in June 2015.

Albania has adjusted its internal organization 21 times since its Declaration of Independence from the Ottoman Empire in 1912. Immediately prior to the most recent reforms, the 308 or 309 communes were rural municipalities which served as second-level divisions of the country outside of its cities. They now serve as the level of local government across the country, each under the authority of the nearest urban center and each overseeing any nearby villages. Because of their intermediate status between the cities and villages, the communes are also sometimes known in English translation as towns.

List

Berat County
Berat County has 20 communes and 241 villages.

 Bogovë, with 9 villages
 Çepan, with 14 villages
 Gjerbes, with 14 villages
 Kozare, with 11 villages
 Leshnjë, with 8 villages
 Perondi, with 7 villages
 Potom, with 12 villages
 Roshnik, with 13 villages
 Sinjë, with 14 villages
 Tërpan, with 14 villages
 Vendreshë, with 10 villages
 Vërtop, with 11 villages
 Zhepë, with 16 villages
 Cukalat, with 6 villages
 Kutalli, with 10 villages
 Lumas, with 13 villages
 Otllak, with 10 villages
 Poshnje, with 12 villages
 Qendër, with 24 villages
 Velabisht, with 13 villages

Dibër County
Dibër County has 32 communes and 280 villages.
 Arras, with 9 villages
 Baz, with 5 villages
 Derjan, with 7 villages
 Fushë-Bulqizë, with 4 villages
 Gjoricë, with 6 villages
 Gurrë, with 6 villages
 Kala e Dodës, with 8 villages
 Kastriot, with 15 villages
 Klos, with 14 villages
 Komsi, with 10 villages
 Lis, with 7 villages
 Lurë, with 10 villages
 Luzni, with 6 villages
 Maqellarë, with 22 villages
 Melan, with 12 villages
 Muhurr, with 7 villages
 Ostren, with 13 villages
 Rukaj, with 6 villages
 Selishtë, with 6 villages
 Shupenzë, with 12 villages
 Sllovë, with 10 villages
 Suç, with 5 villages
 Tomin, with 14 villages
 Trebisht, with 6 villages
 Ulëz, with 6 villages
 Xibër, with 6 villages
 Zerqan, with 13 villages
 Fushë-Çidhën, with 4 villages
 Martanesh, with 8 villages
 Zall-Dardhë, with 9 villages
 Zall-Reç, with 9 villages

Durrës County
Durrës County has 10 communes and 108 villages.
 Bubq, with 7 villages
 Nikël, with 9 villages
 Kodër-Thumanë, with 9 villages
 Xhafzotaj, with 7 villages
 Çudhi, with 10 villages
 Gjepalaj, with 9 villages
 Ishëm, with 9 villages
 Katund i Ri, with 9 villages
 Maminas, with 8 villages
 Rrashbull, with 8 villages
23 villagest të ngelura i përkasin bashkive: Sukth (6), Manëz (8), Krujë (3) dhe Fushë-Krujë (6).

Elbasan County
Elbasan County has 45 communes and 385 villages.
 Gjocaj, with 9 villages
 Karinë, with 7 villages
 Kodovjat, with 12 villages
 Kukur, with 10 villages
 Kushovë, with 8 villages
 Lenie, with 6 villages
 Orenje, with 10 villages
 Pajovë, with 12 villages
 Përparim, with 14 villages
 Pishaj, with 20 villages
 Poroçan, with 5 villages
 Qendër, with 12 villages
 Qukës, with 11 villages
 Rrajcë, with 7 villages
 Shezë, with 7 villages
 Skënderbegas, with 13 villages
 Stravaj, with 6 villages
 Sult, with 9 villages
 Tunjë, with 12 villages
 Bradashesh, with 17 villages
 Fierzë, with 4 villages
 Funarë, with 9 villages
 Gjergjan, with 7 villages
 Gjinar, with 11 villages
 Gostimë, with 6 villages
 Gracen, with 9 villages
 Grekan, with 4 villages
 Hotolisht, with 7 villages
 Kajan, with 10 villages
 Klos, with 8 villages
 Labinot-Fushë, with 6 villages
 Labinot-Mal, with 10 villages
 Lunik, with 7 villages
 Mollas, with 6 villages
 Papër, with 13 villages
 Polis, with 6 villages
 Rrasë, with 4 villages
 Shalës, with 6 villages
 Shirgjan, with 7 villages
 Shushicë, with 9 villages
 Steblevë, with 7 villages
 Tregan, with 13 villages
 Zavalinë, with 6 villages

Fier County
Fier County has 37 communes and 269 villages.
 Frakull, with 8 villages
 Allkaj, with 8 villages
 Aranitas, with 6 villages
 Ballagat, with 7 villages
 Bubullime, with 7 villages
 Cakran, with 12 villages
 Dërmenas, with 12 villages
 Divjakë, with 10 villages
 Dushk, with 7 villages
 Fier-Shegan, with 13 villages
 Fratar, with 6 villages
 Golem, with 6 villages
 Grabjan, with 3 villages
 Gradishtë, with 9 villages
 Greshicë, with 2 villages
 Hekal, with 4 villages
 Hysgjokaj, with 5 villages
 Karbunarë, with 10 villages
 Kolonjë, with 9 villages
 Krutje, with 11 villages
 Kuman, with 4 villages
 Kurjan, with 4 villages
 Kutë, with 4 villages
 Levan, with 11 villages
 Libofshë, with 11 villages
 Mbrostar, with 6 villages
 Ngraçan, with 2 villages
 Portez, with 6 villages
 Qendër, Ballsh, with 12 villages
 Qendër, Fier, with 10 villages
 Remas, with 8 villages
 Ruzhdie, with 5 villages
 Selitë, Ballsh, with 4 villages
 Strum, with 5 villages
 Tërbuf, with 7 villages
 Topojë, with 9 villages
 Zharrez, with 6 villages

Gjirokastër County
Gjirokastër County has 24 communes and 265 villages.
 Antigonë, with 5 villages
 Ballaban, with 14 villages
 Buzë, with 13 villages
 Çarshovë, with 9 villages
 Cepo, with 11 villages
 Dishnicë, with 15 villages
 Dropull i Poshtëm, with 16 villages
 Dropull i Sipërm, with 18 villages
 Frashër, with 8 villages
 Krahës, with 10 villages
 Kurvelesh, with 5 villages
 Lazarat, with 2 villages
 Lopës, with 5 villages
 Luftinje, with 15 villages
 Lunxhër, with 10 villages
 Memaliaj Fshat, with 8 villages
 Odire, with 5 villages
 Petran, with 15 villages
 Picar, with 5 villages
 Pogon, with 7 villages
 Qendër, with 38 villages
 Qesarat, with 7 villages
 Sukë, with 14 villages
 Zagori, with 10 villages

Korçë County
Korçë County has 31 communes and 340 villages.
 Barmash, with 10 villages
 Leskovik, with 14 villages
 Novoselë, with 10 villages
 Buçimas, with 8 villages
 Çërravë, with 11 villages
 Çlirim, with 12 villages
 Dardhas, with 9 villages
 Drenovë, with 8 villages
 Gorë, with 18 villages
 Hoçisht, with 10 villages
 Lekas, with 12 villages
 Libonik, with 13 villages
 Liqenas, with 9 villages
 Miras, with 16 villages
 Moglicë, with 17 villages
 Mollaj, with 5 villages
 Mollas, with 14 villages
 Pirg, with 11 villages
 Pojan, with 12 villages
 Progër, with 8 villages
 Proptisht, with 15 villages
 Qendër, Korçë, with 13 villages
 Qendër, Devoll, with 10 villages
 Qendër, Kolonjë, with 16 villages
 Trebinjë, with 15 villages
 Udënisht, with 6 villages
 Velçan, with 9 villages
 Vithkuq, with 13 villages
 Voskop, with 7 villages
 Voskopojë, with 5 villages
 Vreshtas, with 4 villages

Kukës County
Kukës County has 25 communes and 187 villages.
 Arrën, with 5 villages
 Bicaj, with 10 villages
 Bujan, with 9 villages
 Bushtricë, with 7 villages
 Bytyç, with 13 villages
 Fajzë, with 6 villages
 Fierzë, with 5 villages
 Gjinaj, with 6 villages
 Golaj, with 12 villages
 Grykë-Çajë, with 4 villages
 Kalis, with 5 villages
 Kolsh, with 3 villages
 Krumë, with 7 villages
 Lekbibaj, with 12 villages
 Llugaj, with 6 villages
 Malzi, with 12 villages
 Margegaj, with 10 villages
 Shishtavec, with 7 villages
 Shtiqën, with 4 villages
 Surroj, with 4 villages
 Terthorë, with 6 villages
 Topojan, with 5 villages
 Tropojë, with 15 villages
 Ujmisht, with 7 villages
 Zapod, with 7 villages

Lezhë County
Dibër County has 14 communes and 117 villages.
 Balldre, with 8 villages
 Blinisht, with 7 villages
 Dajç, with 7 villages
 Fan, with 17 villages
 Fushë-Kuqë, with 5 villages
 Kaçinar, with 7 villages
 Kallmet, with 4 villages
 Kolsh, with 9 villages
 Kthelle, with 9 villages
 Milot, with 14 villages
 Orosh, with 15 villages
 Selitë, with 9 villages
 Shëngjin, with 5 villages
 Shënkoll, with 7 villages
 Ungrej, with 9 villages
 Zejmen, with 7 villages

Shkodër County
Dibër County has 28 communes and 276 villages.
 Qerret, with 12 villages
 Ana-Malit, with 10 villages
 Bërdicë, with 6 villages
 Blerim, with 7 villages
 Bushat, with 14 villages
 Dajç (Shkodër), with 11 villages
 Fierzë, with 8 villages
 Gjegjan, with 10 villages
 Gruemirë, with 15 villages
 Guri i Zi, with 11 villages
 Hajmel, with 5 villages
 Iballë, with 8 villages
 Kastrat, with 12 villages
 Kelmend, with 8 villages
 Postribë, with 11 villages
 Pult, with 7 villages
 Qafë-Mali, with 9 villages
 Qelez, with 9 villages
 Qendër, with 8 villages
 Rrapë, with 8 villages
 Rrethinat, with 10 villages
 Shalë, with 11 villages
 Shkrel, with 12 villages
 Shllak, with 7 villages
 Shosh, with 5 villages
 Temal, with 10 villages
 Velipojë, with 10 villages
 Vig-Mnele, with 3 villages
19 villagest të ngelura i përkasin bashkive: Shkodra (2), Vau i Dejës (9), Koplik (3), Puka (2) dhe Fushë-Arrëza (3).

Tirana County
Tirana County has 24 communes and 219 villages.
 Golem, with 11 villages
 Gosë, with 5 villages
 Kryevidh, with 10 villages
 Baldushk, with 14 villages
 Bërxullë, with 3 villages
 Bërzhitë, with 12 villages
 Dajt, with 13 villages
 Farkë, with 6 villages
 Helmas, with 10 villages
 Kashar, with 7 villages
 Krrabë, with 3 villages
 Lekaj, with 9 villages
 Luz i Vogël, with 4 villages
 Ndroq, with 11 villages
 Paskuqan, with 8 villages
 Petrelë, with 17 villages
 Pezë, with 10 villages
 Prezë, with 7 villages
 Shëngjergj, with 12 villages
 Sinaballaj, with 9 villages
 Synej, with 7 villages
 Vaqar, with 10 villages
 Zall-Bastar, with 12 villages
 Zall-Herr, with 9 villages

Vlorë County
Vlorë County has 19 communes and 173 villages.
 Lukovë, with 9 villages
 Vergo, with 8 villages
 Aliko, with 11 villages
 Armen, with 7 villages
 Brataj, with 10 villages
 Dhivër, with 12 villages
 Finiq, with 7 villages
 Horë-Vranisht, with 5 villages
 Kotë, with 10 villages
 Ksamil, with 1 village
 Livadhja, with 15 villages
 Markat, with 6 villages
 Mesopotam, with 15 villages
 Novoselë, with 12 villages
 Qendër, with 12 villages
 Sevaster, with 8 villages
 Shushicë, with 9 villages
 Vllahinë, with 12 villages
 Xarrë, with 4 villages

See also
 Administrative divisions of Albania
 Counties of Albania
 Municipalities of Albania
 List of cities and towns in Albania
 Villages of Albania

References

External links
Shoqata e komunave të Shqipërsë

Government of Albania
Albania geography-related lists
Albania